Virginia State Library-Oliver Hill Building, also known as the State Finance Building, is a historic library and government office building located on Capitol Square in Richmond, Virginia. It was built in 1892–1894, expanded in 1908–1910, remodeled in 1929, and renovated and expanded in 2004. It is a three-story, Beaux Arts style building with a buff brick veneer and terra cotta detailing. It features an Ionic order portico echoing the Virginia State Capitol’s portico.  It originally housed the Virginia State Library collections, the Virginia Supreme Court, and office of the Attorney General. From 1910 to 1964, the State Museum of Natural History was housed in a new wing.  In 1939, the functions of the State Library and Supreme Court were moved to the new Virginia State Library building, now the Patrick Henry Building, and the building was rechristened the State Finance Building. On October 28, 2005, the building was officially renamed the Oliver Hill Building, after Oliver Hill.

The offices of the Lieutenant Governor of Virginia and the Virginia Department of Agriculture and Consumer Services are located in the Oliver Hill Building. It was listed on the National Register of Historic Places in 2008.

References

Government buildings on the National Register of Historic Places in Virginia
Beaux-Arts architecture in Virginia
Government buildings completed in 1894
Buildings and structures in Richmond, Virginia
National Register of Historic Places in Richmond, Virginia